Qaleh-ye Nashin Shahi (also Romanized as Qalʿeh Nashīn Shāhī; also known as Qaleh-ye Shinshahi) is a village in Shurab Rural District, Veysian District, Dowreh County, Lorestan Province, Iran. At the 2006 census, its population was 72, in 14 families.

References 

Towns and villages in Dowreh County